WVKO may refer to:

 WVKO-FM, a radio station (103.1 FM) licensed to Johnstown, Ohio, United States
 WWCD (AM), a radio station (1580 AM) licensed to Columbus, Ohio, which held the call sign WVKO from 1951 to 2020